Terrell Maze (born March 13, 1984) is a former Canadian football cornerback. He was signed by the Baltimore Ravens as an undrafted free agent in 2007. He played college football at San Diego State.

Maze has also been a member of the Los Angeles Avengers, New York Sentinels, Omaha Nighthawks, Sacramento Mountain Lions and Saskatchewan Roughriders.

Early years
Maze attended and played high school football at Santa Monica High School in Santa Monica, California. Maze was a 2001 All-CIF selection at cornerback as a senior at Santa Monica High School. He also saw some time on offense for the Vikings, catching seven touchdown passes, and also returned two kickoffs for scores while helping the Vikings to a CIF championship during his high school career.

College career
Maze played college football at San Diego State from 2003 to 2006, recording 136 tackles, four interceptions and 20 pass breakups in 42 games.

Professional career

Baltimore Ravens
After going undrafted in the 2007 NFL Draft, Maze signed with the Baltimore Ravens as an undrafted free agent. He was waived prior to the regular season.

Los Angeles Avengers
Maze signed with the Los Angeles Avengers of the Arena Football League in October 2007 and played with the team during the 2008 season. He recorded 83 tackles, two interceptions, 13 pass breakups, a forced fumble, two fumble recoveries and one touchdown during his rookie season.

Maze was released from his contract when the AFL folded in 2009.

New York Sentinels
Maze was drafted by the New York Sentinels of the United Football League in the UFL Premiere Season Draft. He signed with the team on August 5, 2009.

Saskatchewan Roughriders
Terrell Maze signed with the Saskatchewan Roughriders of the Canadian Football League. Through his first three seasons in the CFL Maze accumulated 106 tackles, 1 quarterback sack 2 interceptions and 1 fumble recovery. Following the 2014 CFL season Maze signed a contract extension to stay with the Riders.

External links
 Saskatchewan Roughriders bio 
 San Diego State Aztecs bio
 Just Sports Stats

1984 births
Living people
Players of American football from Texas
Players of American football from Santa Monica, California
American football cornerbacks
San Diego State Aztecs football players
Baltimore Ravens players
Los Angeles Avengers players
New York Sentinels players
Omaha Nighthawks players
Sacramento Mountain Lions players
Saskatchewan Roughriders players